Kumble may refer to:

Anil Kumble (born 1970), an Indian cricketer
Anna Kumble (born 1978), British pop singer also known as Lolly
Roger Kumble (born 1966), American writer and film director
Kanipura Sri Gopalakrishna Temple Kumble

See also
Kumbla, also spelled Kumble, a town in Kerala, India
Kumble R. Subbaswamy, university administrator
Kumble N. Umesh, Cognizant Technology Solutions